George Scott Wallace (9 August 1929 – 15 October 2011) was a British Columbia physician and politician.

Wallace was born in Leven, Fife, Scotland, and attended the Edinburgh University Medical School from 1947 to 1952. Wallace came to Canada in 1957 and opened a general practice in Victoria in 1961. He served as an alderman from 1967 to 1969 on the Oak Bay Municipal Council and was elected in the 1969 general election as a Social Credit Member of the British Columbia Legislative Assembly for Oak Bay.

Wallace crossed the floor to join the British Columbia Progressive Conservative Party in 1971 and was re-elected as a Tory in the 1972 general election. He was elected leader of the party in 1973, after the previous party leader failed to win a seat, and led it through the 1975 general election in which he was the only Tory MLA to win a seat. He stepped down as party leader in July, 1977 and retired from the legislature on 31 December 1977 in order to return to his medical practice.

In 1993, he announced that he was willing to help terminally ill Sue Rodriguez end her life if the courts rejected her attempt to challenge the law banning assisted suicide. He subsequently served as medical advisor to the Right to Die Society. Rodriguez died in February 1994 with the assistance of an anonymous physician.

Wallace died, aged 82, in Victoria, British Columbia.

References

1929 births
2011 deaths
Alumni of the University of Edinburgh
British Columbia Social Credit Party MLAs
British Columbia Conservative Party leaders
British Columbia Conservative Party MLAs